|}

The City Walls Stakes is a Listed flat horse race in Great Britain open to horses aged three years or older.
It is run at York over a distance of 5 furlongs (1,006 metres), and it is scheduled to take place each year in July.

The race was transferred to York in 2011 having previously been run at Chester.  It was run as a handicap prior to becoming a Conditions race in 1993.

Records

Most successful horse (3 wins):
Tedburrow (1997, 1998, 1999)

Leading jockey (3 wins):
David Allan – Hamish McGonagall (2012), Take Cover (2017), Copper Knight (2019)

Leading trainer (5 wins):
Eric Alston – Stack Rock (1993), Ziggy's Dancer (1995), Tedburrow (1997, 1998, 1999)

Winners

See also
 Horse racing in Great Britain
 List of British flat horse races

References
Racing Post:

Flat races in Great Britain
York Racecourse
Open sprint category horse races